Ha Seung-joon (born 6 April 1998) is a South Korean footballer currently playing as a defender for Belgian side Tubize.

Career statistics

Club

Notes

References

1998 births
Living people
South Korean footballers
South Korean expatriate footballers
Association football defenders
Challenger Pro League players
A.F.C. Tubize players
South Korean expatriate sportspeople in Belgium
Expatriate footballers in Belgium